Eleftherochori is the name of several villages in Greece:

 Eleftherochori, Grevena, a village in Grevena municipality
 Eleftherochori, Ioannina, a village in Dodoni municipality
 Eleftherochori, Kilkis, a village in Kilkis Prefecture
 Eleftherochori, Magnesia, a village in Feres
 Eleftherochori, Pella, a village in Pella municipality
 Eleftherochori, Phthiotis, a village in Lamia municipality
 Eleftherochori, Trikala, a village in Pyli municipality